George Alexander Whitehead (born 17 March 1989) is a South African professional rugby union player for the  in Pro14 on loan from  in the Currie Cup and in the Rugby Challenge. He can play as a fly-half or fullback.

Career

Free State / Shimlas

Born in Bloemfontein, he attended Grey College. Whitehead represented Free State in several youth competitions; he played for them at the under-16 Grant Khomo Week competition in 2005 and at the under-18 Craven Week competition in 2006.

After finishing high school, he joined their Academy and played for the  side in the 2008 under-19 Provincial Championship. The following season, he was part of the  squad that played in the 2009 under-21 Provincial Championship.

He started five of their matches during the 2010 Varsity Cup and ended the competition as Shimlas' top scorer, contributing 45 points with the boot. He was heavily involved in the' 2010 Vodacom Cup campaign, starting eight of their ten matches in the competition to help them reach the final for the third time in their history.

Later in 2010, Whitehead played a crucial rule in the run to the semi-finals of the 2010 Under-21 Provincial Championship, scoring three tries and kicking 120 points with the boot to end the season as Free State's top points scorer.

Eastern Province Kings

He started their next three matches of the competition, but then found himself behind Louis Strydom in the pecking order. Nevertheless, he still played a crucial part in their season, scoring a total of 56 points – second only to Strydom for the Kings – to help them finish in second spot in the log.

Whitehead was involved in a car accident at the start of 2012, sustaining injuries that kept him out of the entire 2012 Vodacom Cup. He returned to fitness in time for the kick-off of the 2012 Currie Cup First Division season and scored the EP Kings' first try of the season in the 12th minute of their 25–20 victory over defending champions  in Wellington. He played in a total of fifteen matches during the season, top-scoring for the Kings with 142 points to help them reach their third consecutive final in the competition. His kicking boot proved crucial as he contributed eleven points in the Kings' 26–25 victory over rivals, the newly-relegated , to help the Kings clinch their second First Division title in three seasons.

With the being granted entry to play in the 2013 Super Rugby season, Whitehead was named in their 35-man squad. The Kings signed Demetri Catrakilis to be their first-choice fly-half and kicker, which meant that Whitehead was mainly used as backup to him and fullback SP Marais. He again started their next match where they went one better, securing their first ever victory on foreign soil by beating the  30–27 in Melbourne. He eventually made ten starts in the competition and appeared as a substitute a further five times. He played in both legs as the Kings lost 42–44 on aggregate to lose their Super Rugby status for 2014.

The final was a repeat of the 2012 final, but this time the  ran out as winners of the competition, beating the EP Kings 53–30 in a match in Nelspruit. A decision from the South African Rugby Union to expand the Premier Division of the Currie Cup from six teams to eight teams meant that both sides that played in the final were promoted to the 2014 Currie Cup Premier Division.

In June 2014, Whitehead was selected in the starting line-up for the  side to face  during a tour match during a 2014 incoming tour. He played the entire match and scored a last-minute conversion as the Kings suffered a 12–34 defeat.

Griffons

References

South African rugby union players
Eastern Province Elephants players
Southern Kings players
Free State Cheetahs players
Alumni of Grey College, Bloemfontein
Living people
Rugby union players from Bloemfontein
South African people of British descent
1989 births
Griffons (rugby union) players
Cheetahs (rugby union) players
Griquas (rugby union) players
Stormers players
Rugby union fly-halves